The Bahrain World Trade Center (also called Bahrain WTC or BWTC) is a , 50-floor, twin tower complex located in Manama, Bahrain. Designed by the multi-national architectural firm Atkins, construction on the towers was completed in 2008. It is the first skyscraper in the world to integrate wind turbines into its design. The wind turbines were developed, built and installed by the Danish company Norwin A/S.

The structure is constructed close to the King Faisal Highway, near popular landmarks such as the towers of Bahrain Financial Harbour (BFH), NBB and Abraj Al Lulu. It currently ranks as the second-tallest building in Bahrain, after the twin towers of the Bahrain Financial Harbour. The project has received several awards for sustainability, including:
 The 2006 LEAF Award for Best Use of Technology within a Large Scheme.
 The Arab Construction World for Sustainable Design Award.

Structural details 
The two towers are linked via three skybridges, each holding a 225 kW wind turbine, totalling to 675 kW of wind power capacity. Each of these turbines measure  in diameter, and is aligned north, which is the direction from which air from the Persian Gulf blows in. The sail-shaped buildings on either side are designed to funnel wind through the gap to provide accelerated wind passing through the turbines. This was confirmed by wind tunnel tests, which showed that the buildings create an S-shaped flow, ensuring that any wind coming within a 45° angle to either side of the central axis will create a wind stream that remains perpendicular to the turbines. This significantly increases their potential to generate electricity.

The wind turbines are expected to provide 11% to 15% of the towers' total power consumption, or approximately 1.1 to 1.3 GWh a year. This is equivalent to providing the lighting for about 300 homes, 258 hospitals, 17 industrial plants, and 33 car engines. The three turbines were turned on for the first time on 8 April 2008. They are expected to operate 50% of the time on an average day.

Popular fiction 
The Bahrain WTC was featured prominently in the 2009 science fiction SyFy channel made-for-television movie Annihilation Earth. In the movie, an incident involving a subatomic collider in the year 2020 creates cataclysmic effects on planet Earth. CGI is used in the movie to show the WTC collapsing as a result of an earthquake, though the reason for the earthquake is not fully explained in the movie.

Gallery

See also 
 List of tallest structures in Bahrain
 List of twin buildings and structures
 List of world trade centers
 Unconventional wind turbines

References

External links 

 bahrainwtc.com/
 Bahrain World Trade Center Captures Innovation Award
 Worldwatch, Bahrain Propels Wind Energy to Urban Future
 BBC, Skyscraper powered by wind
 The World Trade Center at Baharain has Giant Wind Turbines!
 Faithful+Gould Middle East & India

Office buildings completed in 2008
Buildings and structures in Manama
Skyscrapers in Bahrain
Sustainable buildings in Bahrain
Bahrain
Twin towers
Skyscraper office buildings